Flossmoor is a station on Metra's Metra Electric Line located in Flossmoor, Illinois. The station is located at Flossmoor Road and Sterling Road. The station is on a solid-fill elevated structure and consists of a 1906-built Illinois Central Railroad building next to one island platform which serves the Metra Electric Line's two tracks. There is no ticket agent at Flossmoor, but tickets may be purchased from a vending machine in the waiting room. The old station house is used as a local restaurant and beer brewery, and contains an ice cream shop for kids that operates out of a former Illinois Central Railroad caboose.

References

External links

Dynamic Depot Maps image
Flossmoor Station Restaurant & Brewery and Old Caboose Ice Cream Shop
Flossmoor Road entrance from Google Maps Street View

Metra stations in Illinois
Former Illinois Central Railroad stations
Railway stations in Cook County, Illinois
Railway stations in the United States opened in 1856